This is the episode guide of The X-Family (終極一家). It aired on GTV.

Click here to visit the episode guides of the first series KO One (終極一班) and the third series K.O.3an Guo (終極三國).

Episode list

Lists of Taiwanese television series episodes